Percussion Bitter Sweet is an album by jazz drummer Max Roach recorded in 1961, released on Impulse! Records. It was trumpeter Booker Little's penultimate recording before he died from uremia in early October 1961.

Track listing
All compositions by Max Roach, except where noted

"Garvey's Ghost" - 7:53
"Mama" - 4:50
"Tender Warriors" - 6:52
"Praise for a Martyr" - 7:09
"Mendacity" (Chips Bayen, Max Roach) - 8:54
"Man From South Africa" - 5:12

Tracks 1 and 5 recorded on August 1, 1961; #2 and 3 on August 3; #4 on August 8 and #6 on August 9, 1961.

Personnel
Booker Little - trumpet
Julian Priester - trombone
Eric Dolphy - alto saxophone, flute, bass clarinet
Clifford Jordan - tenor saxophone
Mal Waldron - piano
Art Davis - double bass
Max Roach - drums, percussion
Carlos "Patato" Valdés - congas (1, 3, 6)
Eugenio "Totico" Arango (credited as Carlos Eugenio) - cowbell (1, 3, 6)
Abbey Lincoln - vocal (1, 5)

Production
Margo Guryan - liner notes

References

Impulse! Records albums
Max Roach albums
1961 albums